Poetry Records is a record company currently based at Culture and Science Park, Renmin University of China in Beijing. It is an independent music label dedicated to promoting high-end musical theater and pop music for the Chinese-speaking world, with both high artistic level and accessibility to ordinary audiences, rather than specializing in any particular genre.

Poetry Records is a record company currently based at Culture and Science Park, Renmin University of China in Beijing. It is an independent music label dedicated to promoting high-end musical theater and pop music for the Chinese-speaking world, with both high artistic level and accessibility to ordinary audiences, rather than specializing in any particular genre. Poetry Records was founded in Nov. 2007 in Chicago by musician and music entrepreneur Chuxiao. Now, the label also has a studio in Shanghai, led by guitarist and producer Wangshan as music director.

Founder
Chuxiao Completing his study at the Harris School of Public Policy, University of Chicago, a classical guitarist, composer, songwriter, and producer, Chuxiao is a member of ASCAP (American Society of Composers, Authors, and Publishers). He holds a master's degree from the New England Conservatory of Music (Boston), where he studied with great guitarist Maestro Eliot Fisk. He was also educated at Boston College (Ph.D) and Peking University, China (M.Ph, BA).

Music
Guitar Poem 1:  Fairy Tale
Guitar poem 2: No, No, No
Guitar poem 3: Day and Night of Love

Musical Theatre
The musical “Apple and Pear” consists of three scenarios across different times and spaces, namely, ancient Oriental, medieval European, and contemporary Chinese. The love between the hero and heroin is the most obvious theme that links the three scenarios. It is also true that the eternal longing for morality, happiness, and justice in human nature is what really behind these stories, and makes them so real, despite of the same truth of human sinfulness which prevents the ideals from being realized. Still, it is these noble longings innate in the soul of human kind that make human being human, and make human lives worth of living. As long as human kind exists, the stories of this kind will continue.

References
 Poetry Records
Chu Xiao

Chinese independent record labels
Record labels established in 2007